Psora is a genus of lichen-forming fungi in the family Psoraceae. Members of the genus are commonly called fishscale lichens. Lichens in the genus Psora are known to have a squamulose thallus and anthraquinones in the hymenium.

Species

Psora altotibetica 
Psora brunneocarpa 
Psora crenata 
Psora crystallifera 
Psora decipiens 
Psora globifera 
Psora hyporubescens 
Psora icterica 
Psora indigirkae 
Psora peninsularis 
Psora pruinosa 
Psora rubiformis 
Psora taurensis 
Psora testacea

References

Lecanorales
Lichen genera
Lecanorales genera
Taxa described in 1796
Taxa named by Georg Franz Hoffmann